Methamphetamine is a central nervous system stimulant that is mainly used as a recreational drug.

Meth or meths may also refer to:

Chemicals and substances
 Meth-, a prefix for methyl group organic chemicals
 Methadone,  a synthetic opioid
 Methanol, a simple alcohol with formula CH3OH
 Methylated spirit, ethanol that has additives to make it more poisonous or unpalatable

People
 Meth, the stage name of Michalis Kouinelis (born 1979), Greek singer
 Keegan Meth (born 1988), Zimbabwean cricketer
 Method Man (born 1971), American hip-hop artist
 Crystal Methyd (born 1991), American drag queen

Arts and entertainment
 Meth (album), 2011 album by rapper Z-Ro
 Meth (film), a 2006 documentary on drug abuse among gay men

See also
Math (disambiguation)